The eighth Connecticut House of Representatives district elects one member of the Connecticut House of Representatives. It is currently represented by Timothy J. Ackert. The district consists of the entire towns of Columbia, Coventry and part of the town of Vernon. Prior to 2001, the district also contained part of Lebanon but contained only part of Coventry.

List of representatives

Recent elections

External links 
 Google Maps - Connecticut House Districts

References

08
Tolland County, Connecticut